Raymond J Dingledine (born December 17, 1948) is an American pharmacologist and neurobiologist who has made considerable contributions to the field of epilepsy. He serves as Professor in the School of Medicine at Emory University, Atlanta GA, where he chaired the pharmacology department for 25 years and served as Executive Associate Dean of Research for 10 years.

Education 
Dingledine grew up in St. Marys, Ohio, a small town bordering Grand Lake St. Marys.  He attended Michigan State University from 1967–1971 and graduated from Stanford University with a PhD in pharmacology in 1975. His PhD training was under Avram Goldstein. He then did postdoctoral stints with John Kelly and Leslie Iversen in Cambridge UK, and Per Andersen in Oslo Norway. It was in Per’s lab, working with Leif Gjerstad and Iver Langmoen, that he developed a lifelong interest in epilepsy.

Career 
Dingledine joined the Department of Pharmacology at the University of North Carolina Chapel Hill in 1978 as an Assistant Professor, rising to full Professor by 1989. Shortly after a sabbatical year at the Salk Institute in Steve Heinemann’s lab, he joined Emory University in 1992 as Chair of the Department of Pharmacology, a job he held until 2017. He also served as Executive Associate Dean of Research in the School of Medicine from 2004-2005 and 2008–2015.

He has served professional science-intensive organizations throughout his career. He served on the Program Advisory Committee of the Morehouse School of Medicine Neuroscience Institute from its inception in 1997 through 2021, chairing this committee for 14 years. He served the Society for Neuroscience in numerous functions including Treasurer in 2003 and, most recently, as Chair of their Investment Committee for 15 years. At the American Epilepsy Society he chaired the Epilepsy Benchmark Stewards from 2017-2018. From 1995 to 2000, he served as editor-in-chief of Molecular Pharmacology, a major journal sponsored by the American Society for Pharmacology and Experimental Therapeutics. Dingledine co-founded two small pharma companies. NeurOp Inc was founded in 2003 and is currently a clinical stage company focused on developing NMDA receptor modulators for cerebral ischemia, pain and depression. He serves on NeurOp’s Board of Directors and Scientific Advisory Board. Pyrefin Inc was founded in 2019 to develop novel anti-inflammatory drugs to combat cognitive decline and post-operative pain; he chairs Pyrefin’s Board of Directors. He is an inventor of record for 10 awarded US patents.

Research and work 
His early research focused on the modulation of glutamate receptor-mediated synaptic transmission. During this period he and his team discovered that glycine is a coagonist rather than modulator of NMDA receptors, that shrinkage of extracellular space mediates the transition between interictal and ictal states in the high potassium model of seizures, that a single amino acid residue controls calcium permeation in glutamate receptor channels, and that ifenprodil analogs inhibit NMDA receptors by increasing the sensitivity of receptors to proton inhibition. His current research focuses on the myriad roles of neuroinflammation in neurologic disorders. He demonstrated a profound role for EP2 receptor activation by prostaglandin E2 in COX-2 related pathologies. His work highlights the importance of neuroinflammation in epilepsy.

Awards and honors 
Dingledine was elected to the US National Academy of Medicine in 2010, the Norwegian Academy of Science and Letters in 2018, and the National Academy of Inventors in 2022. He was elected as a Fellow of American Association for Advancement of Science in 2003, and a Fellow of the American Society for Pharmacology and Experimental Therapeutics in 2020. His early career was profiled in Nature Medicine in 2002. He received the Bristol-Myers Squibb Neuroscience Award in 1989 and again in 1993, the epilepsy basic research award from the American Epilepsy Society in 1995, a Javits Neuroscience Award from the National Institute of Neurological Disorders and Stroke in 1998, the PhRMA Foundation Career Award in Excellence in 1999, and the Robert R Ruffolo Career Achievement Award from the American Society of Pharmacology and Experimental Therapeutics in 2018. Two endowed prizes have been established in his name, the Ray Dingledine Award for Extraordinary Graduate Achievement in 2018  and the Ray Dingledine Research Impact Award in Pharmacology & Chemical Biology (2019). In 2023, he is awarded the inaugural AMSPC Award in Pharmacology Research and Administration from the Association of Medical School Pharmacology Chairs (AMSPC).

Personal life
Dingledine  has two sons, Brian and Roger. Dingledine has grown bonsai trees since 1971 and for many years was an avid swimmer with a local Master’s group. He competed in the relay division of the Tugaloo Triathlon and his team (3 Stooges) took first place in 2001, 2003 and 2005, thereby serving as Georgia state champions.

Publications

Selected papers

References 

American pharmacologists
American neuroscientists
Members of the National Academy of Medicine
21st-century American scientists
Stanford University alumni
Michigan State University alumni
1948 births
Living people